Sanantha (சனந்தா in Tamil) is a female historical name in the ancient Tamil language. This name describes a cheerful and active nature. It was assumed that the name was closely associated with the goddess Lakshmi, who brings prosperity to life.

Sanandha, Sananda, and Sananta are polysemies. Sa defines the first letter of sangeetham (Tamil for music), and Ananta defines the god Vishnu (considered a consort of Lakshmi).

Tamil feminine given names